Heaven & Earth is the official soundtrack to the 1993 Golden Globe-winning film of the same name directed by Oliver Stone, with the original score composed by Japanese composer Kitarō. The score won a Golden Globe Award for Best Original Score.

Overview
In the score are featured exotic-sounding percussion, gongs and flutes contrasted with synthesizer and orchestral sounds. It also features Chinese huqin, Vietnamese folk tunes and chant-like vocal textures. It is additionally filled with rich orchestral timbres, and earth-shaking taiko drums.

Track listing

References

External links
Kitaro Official site (English)
Kitaro Official site (Japanese) 
Kitaro TV - Kitaro's official YouTube page
Kitaro Facebook

1993 soundtrack albums
Film scores
Kitarō albums